Žilina District is an okres (district) of the Žilina Region in north-western Slovakia. The district was first established in 1923. Its present borders date from 1996. The heart of the district is the Váh and Rajec river valleys. Urbanization has led to the district's becoming one of Slovakia's most highly developed areas.

Municipalities
Belá
Bitarová
Brežany
Čičmany
Divina
Divinka
Dlhé Pole
Dolná Tižina
Dolný Hričov
Ďurčiná
Fačkov
Gbeľany
Horný Hričov
Hôrky
Hričovské Podhradie
Jasenové
Kamenná Poruba
Kľače
Konská
Kotrčiná Lúčka
Krasňany
Kunerad
Lietava
Lietavská Lúčka
Lietavská Svinná-Babkov
Lutiše
Lysica
Malá Čierna
Mojš
Nededza
Nezbudská Lúčka
Ovčiarsko
Paština Závada
Podhorie
Porúbka
Rajec
Rajecká Lesná
Rajecké Teplice
Rosina
Stránske
Stráňavy
Stráža
Strečno
Svederník
Šuja
Teplička nad Váhom
Terchová
Turie
Varín
Veľká Čierna
Višňové
Zbyňov
Žilina

External links
Official site

Districts of Slovakia
Geography of Žilina Region